Elwood L. Thomas (July 24, 1930 – July 30, 1995) was a judge of the Supreme Court of Missouri, under an appointment by then-Governor John Ashcroft.  He was retained at the November, 1992, election.  He died while on the court from complications of Parkinson's Disease.  He was remembered by his fellow judges as "one of the state's best legal minds." Before being appointed to the Supreme Court, Judge Thomas was a professor at the University of Missouri School of Law from 1965 to 1978, and then was a partner at Shook, Hardy & Bacon in Kansas City, Missouri.

References

1930 births
1995 deaths
20th-century American judges
Judges of the Supreme Court of Missouri
University of Missouri School of Law faculty
Deaths from Parkinson's disease
Drake University Law School alumni